Sidzina  is a large village with a population of around 3,200, situated in southern Poland (Lesser Poland Voivodeship, Sucha Beskidza County, Bystra-Sidzina commune).

External links 
 Photo gallery

Villages in Sucha County
Populated places established in 1563
1563 establishments in Europe
16th-century establishments in Poland